The Chalachitra Ratnam Award is one of the annual awards given at the Kerala Film Critics Association Awards since 1993 for lifetime achievement in Malayalam cinema.

Winners

See also
 Chalachitra Prathibha Award
 Ruby Jubilee Award

References

Kerala Film Critics Association Awards